London Bridge is a limestone karst hollowed out by Burra Creek, a tributary of the Queanbeyan River of the Molonglo River, located near Queanbeyan, in New South Wales, near Canberra, Australia. It is now isolated as a meander cutoff and consists of a limestone arch. The arch was listed on (now defunct) Register of the National Estate.

It was first discovered by the European explorers in 1822  Captain Mark Currie, Brigadier Major John Ovens, Joseph Wild, and accompanied by two nameless aboriginal guides. 

The karst arch was in danger of being flooded by the construction of the London Bridge Dam but owing to its limited catchment, the Australian Government constructed Googong Dam instead.  London Bridge is located within the boundaries of the Burra Creek Nature Reserve.

References

External links
  Map of London Bridge, New South Wales on OpenStreetMap

Caves of New South Wales
Tourist attractions in New South Wales
Limestone caves
Queanbeyan